Kuwait competed at the 1984 Summer Paralympics in Stoke Mandeville, Great Britain and New York City, United States. 22 competitors from Kuwait won 8 medals including 1 gold, 3 silver and 4 bronze and finished 31st in the medal table.

See also 
 Kuwait at the Paralympics
 Kuwait at the 1984 Summer Olympics

References 

1984
1984 in Kuwaiti sport
Nations at the 1984 Summer Paralympics